Mandaic is a southeastern Aramaic variety in use by the Mandaean community, traditionally based in southern parts of Iraq and southwest Iran, for their religious books. Classical Mandaic is still employed by Mandaean priests in liturgical rites. The modern descendant of Classical Mandaic, known as Neo-Mandaic or Modern Mandaic, is spoken by a small section of Mandaeans around Ahvaz and Khorramshahr in the southern Iranian Khuzestan province.

Liturgical use of Classical Mandaic is found in Iran (particularly the southern portions of the country), in Baghdad, Iraq and in the diaspora (particularly in the United States, Sweden, Australia and Germany). It is an Eastern Aramaic language notable for its abundant use of vowel letters (mater lectionis with aleph, he only in final position, ‘ayin, waw, yud)) in writing, so-called plene spelling (Mandaic alphabet) and the amount of Iranian and Akkadian language influence on its lexicon, especially in the area of religious and mystical terminology.  Mandaic is influenced by Jewish Palestinian Aramaic, Samaritan Aramaic, Hebrew, Greek, Latin, in addition to Akkadian and Parthian.

Classification
Classical Mandaic belongs to the Southeastern group of Aramaic and is closely related to the Jewish Babylonian Aramaic dialect in the major portions of the Babylonian Talmud, but less to the various dialects of Aramaic appearing in the incantation texts on unglazed ceramic bowls (incantation bowls) found mostly in central and south Iraq as well as the Khuzestan province of Iran. It is less related to the northeastern Aramaic dialect of Syriac.

Usage
This southeastern Aramaic dialect is transmitted through religious, liturgical, and esoteric texts, most of them stored today in the Drower Collection, Bodleian Library (Oxford), and in the Bibliothèque Nationale (Paris), the British Library (London) and in the households of various Mandaeans as religious texts. More specific written objects and of linguistic importance on account of their early transmission (5th – 7th centuries CE) are the earthenware incantation bowls and Mandaic lead rolls (amulets) (3rd–7th centuries CE), including silver and gold specimens that were often unearthed in archaeological excavations in the regions of their historical living sites between Wasiṭ and Baṣra, and frequently in central Iraq, for example (Bismaya, Kish, Khouabir, Kutha, Uruk, Nippur), north and south of the confluences of the Euphrates and Tigris (Abu Shudhr, al-Qurnah), and the adjacent province of Khuzistan (Hamadan).

Phonology

Consonants 

 The glottal stop  is said to have disappeared from Mandaic.
 Sounds [, ] only occur in Arabic and Persian loanwords.
 Both emphatic voiced sounds [, ] and pharyngeal sounds [, ] only occur in Arabic loanwords.

Vowels 

 A short  is often replaced by the short  sound.

Alphabet

Mandaic is written in the Mandaic alphabet. It consists of 23 graphemes, with the last being a ligature. Its origin and development is still under debate. Graphemes appearing on incantation bowls and metal amulet rolls differ slightly from the late manuscript signs.

Lexicography
Lexicographers of the Mandaic language include Theodor Nöldeke, Mark Lidzbarski, Ethel S. Drower, Rudolf Macúch, and Matthew Morgenstern.

Neo-Mandaic

Neo-Mandaic represents the latest stage of the phonological and morphological development of Mandaic, a Northwest Semitic language of the Eastern Aramaic sub-family. Having developed in isolation from one another, most Neo-Aramaic dialects are mutually unintelligible and should therefore be considered separate languages. Determining the relationship between Neo-Aramaic dialects is difficult because of poor knowledge of the dialects themselves and their history.

Although no direct descendants of Jewish Babylonian Aramaic survive today, most of the Neo-Aramaic dialects spoken today belong to the Eastern sub-family of Jewish Babylonian Aramaic and Mandaic, among them Neo-Mandaic that can be described with any certainty as the direct descendant of one of the Aramaic dialects attested in Late Antiquity, probably Mandaic. Neo-Mandaic preserves a Semitic "suffix" conjugation (or perfect) that is lost in other dialects. The phonology of Neo-Mandaic is divergent from other Eastern Neo-Aramaic dialects.

Three dialects of Neo-Mandaic were native to Shushtar, Shah Vali, and Dezful in northern Khuzestan Province, Iran before the 1880s. During that time, Mandeans moved to Ahvaz and Khorramshahr to escape persecution. Khorramshahr had the most Neo-Mandaic speakers until the Iran–Iraq War caused many people to leave Iran. Ahvaz is the only community with a sizeable portion of Neo-Mandaic speakers in Iran as of 1993.

The following table compares a few words in Old Mandaic with three Neo-Mandaic dialects. The Iraq dialect, documented by E. S. Drower, is now extinct.

Sample Text 
The following is a sample text in Mandaic of Article 1 of the Universal Declaration of Human Rights.

Mandaic: "."

Transliteration: "kul ānāʃā māudālẖ āspāsiutā ubkuʃᵵgiātā kui hdādiā. hāb muhā utirātā ʿdlā ʿit rhum uzbr bhdādiā."

English original: "All human beings are born free and equal in dignity and rights. They are endowed with reason and conscience and should act towards one another in a spirit of brotherhood."

See also
 Christian Palestinian Aramaic
 Jewish Palestinian Aramaic
 Samaritan Aramaic language
 Western Aramaic languages

References

Literature

 Theodor Nöldeke. 1862. "Ueber die Mundart der Mandäer," Abhandlungen der Historisch-Philologischen Classe der königlichen Gesellschaft der Wissenschaften zu Göttingen 10: 81-160.
 Theodor Nöldeke. 1964. Mandäische Grammatik, Halle: Waisenhaus; reprint Darmstadt: Wissenschaftliche Buchgesellschaft with Appendix of annotated handnotes from the hand edition of Theodor Nöldeke by Anton Schall.
 Svend Aage Pallis. 1933. Essay on Mandaean Bibliography. London: Humphrey Milford.
 Franz Rosenthal. 1939. "Das Mandäische," in Die aramaistische Forschung seit Th. Nöldeke’s Veröffentlichungen. Leiden: Brill, pp. 224–254.
 Ethel S. Drower and Rudolf Macuch. 1963. A Mandaic Dictionary. Oxford: Clarendon Press.
 Rudolf Macuch. 1965. Handbook of Classical and Modern Mandaic. Berlin: De Gruyter.
 Rudolf Macuch. 1989. Neumandäische Chrestomathie. Wiesbaden: Harrasowitz.
 
 Joseph L. Malone. 1997. Modern and Classical Mandaic Phonology, in Phonologies of Asia and Africa, edited by Alan S. Kaye. Winona Lake: Eisenbrauns.
 Rainer M. Voigt. 2007."Mandaic," in Morphologies of Asia and Africa, in Phonologies of Asia and Africa, edited by Alan S. Kaye. Winona Lake: Eisenbrauns.
 
  
 Charles G. Häberl. 2009. The Neo-Mandaic Dialect of Khorramshahr. Wiesbaden: Harrassowitz.

External links 

 Mandaic lexicon online
 Semitisches Tonarchiv: Tondokument "Ginza Einleitung" — a recording of the opening of the Ginza Rabba spoken by a Mandaean priest.
 Semitisches Tonarchiv: Tondokument "Ahwâz Macuch 01 A Autobiographie" — a recording of autobiographical material by Sâlem Çoheylî in Neo-Mandaic.
 Mandaic.org Information on the Neo-Mandaic Dialect of Khorramshahr

 
Eastern Aramaic languages
Languages of Iran
Languages of Iraq
Sacred languages
Gnosticism